Juqhuri (Aymara jughu muddy place, -ri a suffix, Hispanicized spelling Jucure, Jucuri) is a mountain in the Andes of southern Peru, about  high. It lies in the Tacna Region, Tarata Province, Tarata District. Juqhuri is situated near the Bolivian border, south of the Mawri River (Mauri).

References

Mountains of Peru
Mountains of Tacna Region